The 1984 Big Sky Conference men's basketball tournament was held March 9–10 at the Dee Events Center at Weber State College in Ogden, Utah.

Fourth-seeded Nevada defeated  in the championship game,  to clinch their first Big Sky tournament title.  In the semifinals, the Wolf Pack shocked regular season champion, defending tournament champion, and host Weber State by seventeen points.

Format
For the first time, all eight Big Sky members participated in the conference tournament. Teams were again seeded based on regular season conference records, and all were entered into the quarterfinal round, which was held on the home courts of the top four seeds on Tuesday. The semifinals (Friday) and finals (Saturday) were hosted by the highest remaining seed; the top four seeds all advanced.

Bracket

NCAA tournament
Nevada (17–13) received an automatic bid to the 53-team NCAA tournament, their first Division I tournament appearance. Seeded eleventh in the West regional, the Wolf Pack lost by ten points to sixth seed Washington in the first round in Pullman, Washington. 
Weber State played in the 32-team NIT, winning the opener at home over Fordham by twelve, then fell by two in double overtime at Southwestern Louisiana.

References

Big Sky Conference men's basketball tournament
Tournament
Big Sky Conference men's basketball tournament
Big Sky Conference men's basketball tournament
Basketball competitions in Ogden, Utah
College sports tournaments in Utah